Palaemon concinnus, the mangrove prawn, is a species of shrimp of the family Palaemonidae. Palaemon concinnus is found throughout the Pacific Ocean and Mozambique.

References

Palaemonidae
Crustaceans described in 1852
Taxa named by James Dwight Dana